Heidi Karen Turk married name Heidi Wood (1961-2012), was a female swimmer who competed for Great Britain and England.

Swimming career
Turk represented England and won a silver medal in the 4 x 100 metres freestyle relay, at the 1978 Commonwealth Games in Edmonton, Alberta, Canada.

References

1961 births
2012 deaths
English female swimmers
Commonwealth Games medallists in swimming
Commonwealth Games silver medallists for England
Swimmers at the 1978 Commonwealth Games
Medallists at the 1978 Commonwealth Games